The Girl from Calgary is a 1932 American pre-Code musical comedy film directed by Phil Whitman, and starring Fifi D'Orsay and Paul Kelly.

Plot summary
A French-Canadian girl is a champion bronc rider and is also a nightclub singer. An ambitious young man sees her act one night and is struck by her talent, realizing that she is good enough to become a Broadway star.

He convinces her to accompany him to New York, where she indeed does become a Broadway star. However, the young man finds himself being squeezed out by greedy Broadway producers who see the talented young girl as their own personal gold mine.

Cast
Fifi D'Orsay as Fifi Follette
Paul Kelly as Larry Boyd
Robert Warwick as Bill Webster
Edwin Maxwell as Earl Darrell
Astrid Allwyn as Mazie Williams
Edward Fetherston as Monte Cooper
Adrienne Dore as Lulu, Darrell's secretary (uncredited)

Production background
 The first reel, with an elaborate musical number, is taken from The Great Gabbo (1929) which had at least one sequence filmed in Multicolor.
 When originally released, the first reel of The Girl From Calgary, approximately seven minutes including the title credits, was in 2-strip Magnacolor. Reviewers at the time commented on the poor quality of the color, registration problems, and lack of focus. In surviving prints, this sequence is in black-and-white, with a replaced title card that includes a 1951 copyright statement.

External links

1932 films
1932 musical comedy films
1932 romantic comedy films
1930s color films
American musical comedy films
American romantic comedy films
American romantic musical films
American black-and-white films
Monogram Pictures films
1930s romantic musical films
Films directed by Phil Whitman
1930s English-language films
1930s American films